Vichvin Bala , is a town and union council, an administrative subdivision, of Mianwali District in the Punjab province of Pakistan. It is part of Piplan Tehsil. It is home to the Sial family, who are one of the most prominent feudal families of the region.

References

Union councils of Mianwali District
Populated places in Mianwali District